Paul Guidé (March 18, 1884 – October 16, 1940) was a French film actor of the silent era. Guidé appeared in more than sixty films before 1930 including La dame de Monsoreau (1913) in which he played Henry III of France.

Filmography

References

Bibliography 
 Waldman, Harry. Maurice Tourneur: The Life and Films. McFarland, 2001.

External links 
 

1884 births
1940 deaths
French male film actors
French male silent film actors
Male actors from Paris
20th-century French male actors